Katheryn is a feminine given name. It is a variant of Katherine. Notable people with the name include:

 Katheryn Curi, American cyclist who placed first at the National Road Race Championships in Park City
 Katheryn K. Russell, associate professor of criminology and criminal justice at the University of Maryland
 Katheryn of Berain, Welsh noblewoman noted for her four marriages
 Katheryn Elizabeth Hudson, or Katy Perry - American singer and songwriter
 Katheryn Winnick, Canadian actress. Well known for her role as Lagertha in Vikings.

References